Pryazhinsky District is an administrative district (raion), one of the fifteen in the Republic of Karelia, Russia. It is located in the south of the republic. Its administrative center is the urban locality (an urban-type settlement) of Pryazha. As of the 2010 Census, the total population of the district was 14,664, with the population of Pryazha accounting for 25.1% of that number.

Administrative and municipal status
Within the framework of administrative divisions, Pryazhinsky District is one of the fifteen in the Republic of Karelia and has administrative jurisdiction over one urban-type settlement (Pryazha) and eighty-one rural localities. As a municipal division, the district is incorporated as Pryazhinsky Municipal District. The urban-type settlement of Pryazha and three rural localities are incorporated into an urban settlement, while the remaining seventy-eight rural localities are incorporated into six rural settlements within the municipal district. The urban-type settlement of Pryazha serves as the administrative center of both the administrative and municipal district.

References

Notes

Sources

Districts of the Republic of Karelia
 
